James McFadden (born 1983) is a Scottish football player.

James McFadden may also refer to:
 Jim McFadden (1920–2002), Irish pro hockey player
 James McFadden (dancer), early 20th century American tap dancer
 J. P. McFadden (1930–1998), founder of the Human Life Review
 James A. McFadden (1880–1952), American Catholic bishop